Clinidium segne is a species of ground beetle in the subfamily Rhysodinae. It was described by R.T. Bell & J.R. Bell in 1985. It is known from the Aragua state in northern Venezuela. Clinidium segne females measure  in length.

References

Clinidium
Beetles of South America
Endemic fauna of Venezuela
Beetles described in 1985
Invertebrates of Venezuela